Tada-U is the district of Mandalay Region, Myanmar. Its principal town is Tada-U.


Townships

The townships, cities, towns that are included in Tada-U District are as follows:
Tada-U Township
Tada-U
Ngazun Township
Ngazun

History
On April 30, 2022, new districts were expanded and organized. Tada-U Township from Kyaukse District and Ngazun Township from Myingyan District were formed as Tada-U District.

References

Districts of Myanmar
Mandalay Region